Gac or GAC may refer to:

Gấc, pronounced [ɣək̚˧˦], a Southeast Asian fruit of the species Momordica cochinchinensis
Gać (disambiguation), a common Polish place-name

Acronyms

Companies and organisations
 GAC Group, a Chinese automotive company based in Guangzhou, Guangdong
 GAC Ireland, an Irish bus manufacturer established with Bombardier (1980–1986)
 Games Administration Committee, a committee that organises fixtures within Gaelic games
 Geological Association of Canada
 Global Action for Children, an organization advocating for vulnerable children in the developing world
 Global Affairs Canada, a department of the Canadian federal government
 Gloster Aircraft Company,  an aircraft manufacturing company based in Gloucester, England

Entertainment
 Ghost Adventures Crew, the team featured on the Ghost Adventures television series
 Graphic Adventure Creator, a game creation system of the 1980s by Incentive software
 Great American Country, a family-oriented general entertainment cable TV channel
 General Amusement Corporation, an entertainment booking agency founded in the early 1930s
 Gamaliel Audrey Cantika, an Indonesian vocal group that won an award at the 3rd Indonesian Choice Awards

Technology
 Global Assembly Cache, a component of Microsoft's .NET Framework
 Generic Artificial Consciousness, a database and software of Mindpixel
 Granular activated carbon, a highly porous and absorbent material used extensively in water filtration

Other uses
 Globular Amphora culture, an archaeological culture in central Europe
 Global Assessment Certificate, a university preparation and foundation studies program
 Great American Conference, an NCAA Division II Conference formed in 2010
 Guglielmo Achille Cavellini (1914–1990), influential art collector and mail artist
 GAC, a codon for the amino acid aspartic acid

See also

Gach, Beyhaq Rural District, Sheshtomad District, Sabzevar County, Razavi Khorasan Province, Iran
Gack, Gmina Drawno, Choszczno County, West Pomeranian Voivodeship, Poland